KF Devolli is an Albanian football club based in the small municipality of Devoll, Korçë.

History

Bilisht Sport
Klubi i Futbollit Devolli was founded in 1927 and played under the name Devolli Bilisht. They were renamed to just Bilishti between 1949 and 1950, before changing to Puna Bilisht between 1951 and 1958. The club then reverted its name back to Devolli Bilisht in 1958 which it kept until 2006 when they change their name to Klubi Futbollitik Bilisht Sport.
In the 2010s, another club from Bilisht emerged and called KF Devolli.

They were champions of The Second Division for the 2018-2019 campaign, which promotes them to the First Division upcoming season.

Current squad

Historical list of coaches

 Stavri Nica (Jan 2019 - Nov 2019)
 Festim Fetollari (Nov 2019 -)

Gallery

References

Football clubs in Albania
1927 establishments in Albania
Devoll (municipality)
Association football clubs established in 1927
Kategoria e Dytë clubs